James Roy Tucker (25 December 1909 – 22 September 1987) was a Liberal party member of the House of Commons of Canada. Born in Burnt Point, Newfoundland, he was a manager and merchant by career.

He was first elected at the Trinity—Conception riding in the 1958 general election then was re-elected there in 1962, 1963 and 1965. With riding boundary changes, Tucker was a candidate at the Bonavista—Trinity—Conception riding in the 1968 federal election but was defeated by Frank Moores of the Progressive Conservative party.

References 

1909 births
1987 deaths
Members of the House of Commons of Canada from Newfoundland and Labrador
Liberal Party of Canada MPs